The 1974 Scheldeprijs was the 61st edition of the Scheldeprijs cycle race and was held on 30 July 1974. The race was won by Marc Demeyer.

General classification

References

1974
1974 in road cycling
1974 in Belgian sport